Whitney Chadwick (born 28 July 1943) is an American art historian and educator, who has published on contemporary art, modernism, Surrealism, and gender and sexuality. Her book Women, Art and Society was first published by Thames and Hudson in 1990 and revised in 1997; it is now in its fifth edition. Chadwick is Professor Emerita at San Francisco State University from the School of Art.

Biography 
Her undergraduate degree was a B.A. degree in Fine Arts from Middlebury College in 1965. She received her doctorate from Pennsylvania State University, and an honorary doctorate from the University of Gothenburg in 2003.

She taught at San Francisco State University in the School of Art and is now a Professor Emerita. Additionally she taught at Massachusetts Institute of Technology, Stanford University and University of California, Berkeley.

In 2010–2011 she was a Fellow at the Radcliffe Institute for Advanced Studies at Harvard University, where she worked on In the Company of Women: Female Sexuality and Empowerment in the Surrealist World focusing on surrealist women artists of the 1930s and 1940s.

Chadwick was the second wife of artist Robert Bechtle, until his death in 2020.

Publications
In addition to Women, Art and Society (1990), Chadwick has published Leonora Carrington: la realidad de la imaginacion; Women Artists and the Surrealist Movement; Myth in Surrealist Painting; Amazons in the Drawing Room: The Art of Romaine Brooks; and contributed to the book authored by Liz Rideal, Mirror Images: Women Surrealism, and Self-Representation. Chadwick edited with Isabelle de Courtivron, Significant Others: Creativity and Intimate Partnership; and with Tirza True Latimer edited The Modern Woman Revisited: Paris between the Wars. Her novel Framed was published in 1998.

Exhibition catalog essays
Chadwick has published exhibition catalog essays about Maria Elena Gonzalez, Mona Hatoum, Nalini Malani, and Sheila Hicks, among others.

Honors, awards
Chadwick received many awards and honors including serving as a fellow at the Sterling and Francine Clark Art Institute (2002); the Forum for Advanced Studies in Arts, Languages and Theology at Uppsala University, and a fellowship/residency from the Radcliffe Institute at Harvard University (2010–2011). In 1999 she was given the Award of Distinction by the National Council of Arts Administrators.

See also 
 Women in the art history field

References

External links
 

Women art historians
American art historians
20th-century American historians
21st-century American historians
20th-century American women writers
21st-century American women writers
Pennsylvania State University alumni
Middlebury College alumni
Radcliffe fellows
San Francisco State University faculty
1943 births
Living people
American women historians